Hornsdale is a locality in the Mid North region of South Australia  north of Adelaide.

Mount Lock, Mount Ngaduri, Mount Williams and Champion Hill within the Narien Range form the eastern boundary of Hornsdale locality from south to north.

In October 1880, local landowner William Horne established the post office on section 195B, named Tarcowie East. It was renamed Hornsdale in 1882.

The locality is now home to the 99-turbine Hornsdale Wind Farm operated by Neoen, and the Hornsdale Energy Reserve operated by Tesla, which is known as the world's largest lithium-ion battery.

References

Mid North (South Australia)